= Cleveland Stance =

Anti-gang program in Ohio, United States

Stand Together Against Neighborhood Crime Everyday, also known as STANCE, is an education program created by and based in the City of Cleveland, Ohio. The initiative seeks to lower incidents of violence and criminal activity by promoting anti-gang activities and programs.

The program is funded in part by the United States Department of Justice, and is part of a six-city initiative known as the "Comprehensive Anti-Gang Initiative", formed in 2006.
